The Australia women's national cricket team toured New Zealand in February and March 1975. They played against New Zealand in one Test match, which was drawn.

Squads

Tour Matches

60-over match: Canterbury President's XI v Australia

2-day match: Canterbury v Australia

60-over match: Otago v Australia

1-day single-innings match: Otago v Australia

45-over match: Wellington v Australia

2-day match: Wellington v Australia

2-day match: Auckland v Australia

60-over match: Auckland v Australia

1-day match: South Auckland v Australia

2-day match: North Shore v Australia

WTest Series

1st Test

References

External links
Australia Women tour of New Zealand 1974/75 from Cricinfo

Women's international cricket tours of New Zealand
1975 in New Zealand cricket
Australia women's national cricket team tours